Andreas Emil Knappe (born June 2, 1991) is a Danish-born former American football offensive tackle. He played college football at the University of Connecticut. He was the first Danish player to sign with an NFL team since kicker Morten Andersen.

Early life
Knappe grew up in Silkeborg, Denmark and played team handball as a youth. He was also an archer on the Danish national team, but got tired of it. Knappe first began playing football at the age of 18 because a friend recommended it. After playing for a local team, Knappe joined football powerhouse Triangle Razorbacks of the Danish American Football Federation. He competed on the defensive line on the team that won the 2011 Mermaid Bowl. In 2012, he came to the United States to attend some football camps, and attracted the attention of coach Paul Pasqualoni at the University of Connecticut.

College career
Knappe redshirted his first season at UConn, playing on the defensive line. He played in one game in 2013. In 2014 he played in 10 games, starting the final seven of the season at right tackle. After the season he was named to the 2014 American Athletic Conference All-Academic team. He started all 25 games his final two seasons. Knappe participated in the Goal Line Project, a charity in which he mentored inner-city middle school kids. He was on the 2015 watchlist for the Wuerffel Trophy, awarded to the best FBS player who combines community service with athletic achievement.

Professional career

Atlanta Falcons
Knappe signed with the Atlanta Falcons as an undrafted free agent on May 1, 2017. He was waived by the Falcons on September 2, 2017.

Washington Redskins
On October 16, 2017, Knappe was signed to the Washington Redskins' practice squad. He was released by the Redskins on October 31, 2017.

Indianapolis Colts
On December 4, 2017, Knappe was signed to the Indianapolis Colts' practice squad.

Denver Broncos
On January 17, 2018, Knappe signed a reserve/future contract with the Denver Broncos. He was waived/injured on September 1, 2018 and was placed on injured reserve. He was released on September 7, 2018. He was re-signed to the practice squad on October 24, 2018. On January 2, 2019, Knappe was re-signed to reserve/future contract. He was waived on April 15, 2019.

References

External links
UConn Huskies bio

1991 births
Living people
Danish players of American football
People from Silkeborg
American football offensive tackles
UConn Huskies football players
Atlanta Falcons players
Washington Redskins players
Indianapolis Colts players
Denver Broncos players
Danish emigrants to the United States
Sportspeople from the Central Denmark Region